Villa Krause is a city in the province of San Juan, Argentina in the Cuyo region.

Populated places in San Juan Province, Argentina
Cities in Argentina